This is a list of programmes broadcast on South Korean terrestrial television channels KBS1 and KBS2 of Korean Broadcasting System (KBS) network.

Dramas
KBS prime-time flagship dramas are broadcast on KBS2 at 21:50, generally with two series airing simultaneously, with each series airing on two consecutive nights: Monday–Tuesday and Wednesday–Thursday; and on KBS1 at 20:30 every weekdays and at 20:40 on Saturdays, following the weekend edition of KBS News 9.

KBS2 Monday–Tuesday

KBS2 Wednesday–Thursday

KBS2 Friday–Saturday

 The Producers (프로듀사; 2015)
 Hit the Top (최고의 한방; 2017)
 Strongest Deliveryman (최강 배달꾼; 2017)
 Confession Couple (고백부부; 2017)

KBS2 Friday

 Hi! School: Love On (하이스쿨 – 러브온; 2014)
 Spy (스파이; 2015)
 Orange Marmalade (오렌지 마멀레이드; 2015)
 Imitation (이미테이션; 2021)

KBS2 Saturday–Sunday

KBS2 Saturday–Sunday (19:55)

KBS2 Saturday–Sunday (20:00)
 Three Bold Siblings (삼남매가 용감하게; September 24, 2022 – March 19, 2023)
 The Real Has Come! (진짜가 나타났다!; March 25, 2023)

KBS2 Saturday–Sunday (21:30)
 King Sejong the Great (대왕세종; 2008) (ep 27–86)
 Empress Cheonchu aka The Iron Empress (천추태후; 2009)
 Hot Blood (열혈 장사꾼; 2009)

KBS1 Saturday–Sunday

KBS1 Saturday–Sunday (21:40)

Inspired by Taiga drama from NHK of Japan, historical dramas began to air in 1981 with Daemyeong, a story about Hyojong of Joseon. The series usually airs about 50 minutes every Saturday and Sunday at 21:40.

KBS Daily dramas

KBS1 Monday–Friday (20:30)

KBS2 Monday–Friday (18:50)
 Unstoppable Marriage (못말리는 결혼; 2007–2008)

KBS2 Monday–Friday (19:50)

KBS Drama specials

KBS2 Saturday anthology (23:15)

KBS2 Sunday anthology (23:15)

KBS Morning dramas

KBS Morning Drama is a TV slot that aired dramas at 9 am from Monday to Friday at KBS 2TV. Due to poor ratings, the slot was abolished twice, from October 7, 1991, to October 3, 1992, for about one year, and from October 10, 1994, to March 1, 1996, for about one year and four months. Following the end of Through the Waves and the TV Novel series, this time slot has been revived again with Lady Cha Dal-rae's Lover airing on 2018, 7 years following the discontinuation. This time slot has been quickly cancelled again and replaced by reruns of KBS1's daily dramas.

KBS Teen dramas

 School (학교; 1999–2002)
 Sharp (반올림#; 2003–2007)
 Andante (안단테; 2017–2018)

KBS TV Novel series

KBS1 Monday–Saturday (08:00)

KBS2 Monday–Friday (09:00)

Award shows
 KBS Drama Awards
 KBS Music Awards
 KBS Entertainment Awards

Documentaries

News and current affairs

KBS1
 KBS News Plaza (KBS 뉴스광장, KBS 1TV's Breakfast news programme)
 KBS News 930 (KBS 뉴스930, Mid-morning news programme)
 KBS News 12 (KBS 뉴스12, Midday news programme)
 Each and Every Case (사사건건, talkshow program)
 KBS News 5 (KBS 뉴스5, Early evening news programme)
 KBS News 7 (KBS 뉴스7, Evening news programme with some local segments)
 KBS News 9 (KBS 뉴스9, Main news programme)
  (더 라이브, Nightly talkshow program)
 KBS Newsline (KBS 뉴스라인, Nightly news programme)
 KBS News 2430 (KBS 2430 뉴스, Weekend late night news programme)
 COVID-19 Newsroom (코러나19 통합뉴스룸, special newscast for COVID-19 reports)

KBS2
 Good Morning Korea Live (굿모닝 대한민국 라이브, morning current affairs program)
 KBS 800 Newstime (KBS 800 뉴스타임, KBS 2TV's morning newscast)
 KBS Global News (지구촌 뉴스, KBS 2TV's world newscast)
 Integrated Newsroom ET (통합뉴스룸 ET, Economy newscast)
 KBS 1500 Newstime (KBS 1500 뉴스타임, KBS 2TV's afternoon newscast)

KBS World
 News Today (The channel's only English news programme)

Sports
 2013 KBS Soccer Cup
 KBS Super Rugby

Entertainment

{| class="wikitable sortable plainrowheaders"
|-
! scope="col" | Year
! scope="col" | English title
! scope="col" | Korean title 
|-
! scope="row" | 1984–2019
|  || 연예가중계
|-
! scope="row" | 1999–2020
| Gag Concert || 개그콘서트
|-
! scope="row" | 2000–2018
| VJ's on the scene || VJ특공대
|-
! scope="row" | 2001–2020
| Happy Together || 해피투게더
|-
! scope="row" | 2003–2012
| Sponge || 스펀지
|-
! scope="row" | 2003–2017
| Vitamin|| 비타민
|-
! scope="row" rowspan="2" | 2004–2010
| Star Golden Bell || 스타 골든벨
|-
|  || 상상더하기
|-
! scope="row" | 2004–2019
| Happy Sunday || 해피선데이
|-
! scope="row" | 2005–2020
| Fly Shoot Dori || 날아라 슛돌이
|-bgcolor="#99ff99"
! scope="row" | 2007–present
| 1 Night 2 Days || 1박2일
|-
! scope="row" | 2007–2018
| 1 vs. 100 || 1 대 100
|-
! scope="row" | 2009–2012
| Invincible Youth || 청춘불패
|-
! scope="row" | 2009–2013
| Qualifications of Men || 남자의 자격
|-
! scope="row" | 2009–2016
| Let's Go! Dream Team Season 2 || 출발 드림팀 시즌2
|-
! scope="row" | 2010–2013
| Triumphantly || 탑밴드
|-
! scope="row" | 2010–2019
| Hello Counselor || 대국민 토크쇼!! 안녕하세요
|-
! scope="row" | 2011–2012
| Saturday Freedom || 자유선언 토요일
|-
! scope="row" | 2012–2016
| The Human Condition || 인간의 조건
|-
! scope="row" | 2013–2016
| Cool Kiz On The Block || 우리동네 예능과 체육의 능력자
|-bgcolor="#99ff99"
! scope="row" | 2013–present
| The Return of Superman || 슈퍼맨이 돌아왔다
|-bgcolor="#99ff99"
! scope="row" | 2015–present
| My Neighbor, Charles || 이웃집 찰스
|-
! scope="row" rowspan="2" | 2016–2017
| Singing Battle – Victory || 노래싸움 – 승부
|-
| Sister's Slam Dunk || 언니들의 슬램덩크
|-bgcolor="#99ff99"
! scope="row" | 2016–20202022–present
| Battle Trip || 배틀 트립
|-bgcolor="#99ff99"
! scope="row" | 2016–present
| Mr. House Husband || 살림하는 남자들 
|-
! scope="row" | 2017
| We Like Zines || 냄비받침
|-
! scope="row" | 2017–2018
| One Night Sleepover Trip || 하룻밤만 재워줘
|-
! scope="row" | 2018
| Where on Earth?? || 거기가 어딘데??
|-bgcolor="#99ff99"
! scope="row" | 2018–present
| Problem Child in House || 옥탑방의 문제아들
|-
! scope="row" rowspan="2" | 2018–2019
| Twilight Delight || 볼빨간 당신
|-
| Grandma's Restaurant in Samcheong-dong || 삼청동 외할머니
|-bgcolor="#99ff99"
! scope="row" rowspan="4" | 2019–present
| Boss in the Mirror || 사장님 귀는 당나귀 귀
|-bgcolor="#99ff99"
|  || 갓파더 - 新가족관계증명서
|-bgcolor="#99ff99"
| Stars' Top Recipe at Fun-Staurant || 신상출시 편스토랑
|-bgcolor="#99ff99"
|  || 개는 훌륭하다
|-
|}

Music programs
 Golden Oldies (가요무대; 1985–present)
 Music Bank (뮤직뱅크; 1998–present) – broadcast from KBS New Wing Open Hall in Yeouido-dong, Yeongdeungpo-gu, Seoul.
 Love Letter by Yoon Do-hyun (윤도현의 러브레터; 2002–2008)
 You Hee-Yeol's Sketchbook (유희열의 스케치북; 2009–2022)
 Immortal Songs 2 (불후의 명곡 2; 2011–present) 
 We K-Pop (2019)
 LeeMujin Service'' (리무진 서비스; 2022–present)

See also
 List of programs broadcast by Arirang TV
 List of programs broadcast by Munhwa Broadcasting Corporation
 List of programs broadcast by Seoul Broadcasting System
 List of programs broadcast by tvN
 List of programs broadcast by JTBC

References

External links
 KBS.co.kr – Official KBS Website 
 World.KBS.co.kr – Official KBS World Website

Korean Broadcasting System original programming
Korean Broadcasting System
Korean Broadcasting System